Stubbs may refer to:

Places

United States
Stubbs, California, former name of Clearlake Oaks, California, a census-designated place 
Stubbs, Missouri, an unincorporated community
Stubbs, Texas, an unincorporated community
Stubbs, Wisconsin, a town

Elsewhere
Stubbs, Saint Vincent and the Grenadines, a town in Saint Vincent

Other uses
Stubbs (cat), a cat who was the "mayor" of Talkeetna, Alaska, from 1997–2017
The Stubbs, a partisan militia in the Bleeding Kansas era
Stubbs (surname)
Stubbs, the main character in the video game Stubbs the Zombie in "Rebel Without a Pulse"

See also
Stub (disambiguation) (includes Stub and Stubb)